Laagi Nahi Chhute Rama (Devanagari: लागी नाही छुटे राम; Transl.: Love Never Goes Away) is a 1963 Bhojpuri film, directed by Kundan Kumar and produced by R. Tiwari. This was third Bhojpuri film after Ganga Maiyya Tohe Piyari Chadhaibo and Bidesiya. The film stars Sujit Kumar and Kumkum in the lead roles.

References

External links

1960s Indian films
1960s Bhojpuri-language films